Beniamino Carelli (9 May 1833 – 14 February 1921) was an Italian singing teacher and  composer.

Carelli was born and died in Naples, where he spent many years teaching at the Conservatory of San Pietro a Majella. One of the most sought after vocal teachers in Italy during the late 19th century and early 20th century, his pupils included opera singers Pasquale Amato, Giannina Arangi-Lombardi, Francesco Maria Bonini, Maria Capuana, Fernando De Lucia, Franco Lo Giudice, Riccardo Martin, and Raimund von zur-Mühlen, among others. His book, L'Arte del canto: metodo teorico-pratico (188?), remains an important text on the art of singing.

His daughter, Emma Carelli, also studied under him and had a successful career as a dramatic soprano before taking over the management of the Rome Opera House in 1912-1926.

References

Sources
Tosti by Francesco Sanvitale

1833 births
1921 deaths
Italian composers
Italian male composers
Voice teachers
Musicians from Naples
19th-century Italian musicians
19th-century Italian male musicians